The Iquitos Satellite Laboratory (IQTLAB) was established in 2002 in the city of Iquitos, Peru by doctor Margaret Kosek, biologist Maribel Paredes Olortegui, and nurse Pablo Peñataro Yori, with the collaboration of the Dr. Robert Gilman working group in Lima, Peru and the US Naval Medical Research Unit No. 6 (NAMRU-6) .

The Iquitos Satellite Laboratory (IQTLAB) is supported through NIH and the Bill & Melinda Gates Foundation funded grants.

Purpose
The mission of IQTLAB is to improve understanding of health problems among vulnerable populations in order to identify sustainable solutions that improve their health, social and economic conditions.

Team Members
The IQTLAB team consists of experts from Asociación Benéfica Prisma, the University of Virginia, the Johns Hopkins Bloomberg School of Public Health,  and the Tulane University School of Public Health and Tropical Medicine, among other universities and research institutions worldwide. IQTLAB utilizes a multidisciplinary approach that combines knowledge of the epidemiology of tropical infectious disease, malnutrition, intestinal infection, biostatistics, medical science, demography, ecology, and spatial data collection and analysis.

The Iquitos Satellite Laboratory (IQTLAB) team is led by Margaret Kosek, MD, an associate professor of infectious disease at the University of Virginia Department of Medicine.

Operations

In addition to the laboratory, IQTLAB provides a vast array of support for scientific data collection, including GPS/GIS data collection, survey data collection, satellite image processing, and climate conditions (strategic deployment of weather monitoring systems).

IQTLAB currently has a number of ongoing projects, including:

 Etiology, risk factors and interactions of enteric infections and malnutrition and the consequences for child health and development
 Probiotics for Pediatric Diarrhea in Peru
 Epidemiology of campylobacters in the Peruvian Amazon
 Epidemiology of shigellosis in the Peruvian Amazon
 Serologic assessment of burden of diarrheal disease in children under 5 years old
 Improved Biomarkers for the Assessment of Environmental Enteropathy
 The development of a simple test for small bowel barrier dysfunction applicable to environmental enteropathy
 Global Infectious Disease Training Grant

Since its foundation, the Iquitos Satellite Laboratory (IQTLAB) has been the host and support of national and international students from undergraduate to master and MD/PhD programs.

See also
 MAL-ED network study
 International Atomic Energy Agency

References

External links
 Prisma

Epidemiology organizations
Laboratories
Organisations based in Peru